Trichaea pilicornis is a moth in the family Crambidae. It was described by Gottlieb August Wilhelm Herrich-Schäffer in 1866. It is found in Mexico (Veracruz, Jalapa), Guatemala, Panama, Honduras, Costa Rica, Cuba, Ecuador, French Guiana, Brazil and Argentina.

References

Moths described in 1866
Spilomelinae
Moths of North America
Moths of South America